Gregory Charles Adams (born May 31, 1960) is a Canadian former professional ice hockey forward who played in the National Hockey League (NHL) from 1980 to 1990.

Playing career
Adams was passed over in the 1979 NHL Entry Draft and signed as a free agent with the Philadelphia Flyers in 1979. In his final year in the Western Hockey League (WHL) with the Victoria Cougars he scored 62 goals playing on a line with Barry Pederson. He spent the 1980–81 season with the Flyers' farm team, the Maine Mariners, and impressed in a six-game stint in Philadelphia, scoring three goals. The following season he appeared in 33 games, scoring 19 points.

Adams was traded to the Hartford Whalers in the Mark Howe trade in the summer of 1982. In the 1982–83 season, he spent his first full season in the NHL, scoring 10 goals and 23 points in 79 games. He established himself as a gritty, physical presence and registered 216 penalty minutes (PIM), the highest total of his career.

Adams was dealt again in the summer of 1983, this time to the Washington Capitals. While the Whalers had just 19 wins in 1982–83, the Capitals were one of the deepest squads in the league, and he found it more difficult to get ice time. In his first two years in Washington, he scored just eight goals in 108 games, and was demoted briefly to the American Hockey League (AHL). However, he established himself as a key member of the team in the 1985–86 season, and put up surprising numbers with 18 goals and 56 points, along with 152 PIM. He continued to perform well over the next two seasons, posting totals of 14 and 15 goals while providing his usual physical presence. 

For the 1988–89 season, Adams was moved to the defending Stanley Cup champions Edmonton Oilers. However, he struggled to find a niche with the Oilers, scoring just four goals in 49 games, and was dealt again at the trade deadline, this time to the Vancouver Canucks. This created one of the more unusual situations in NHL history, as the Canucks' lineup already featured star winger Greg "Gus" Adams.

Adams's stint in Vancouver was brief, scoring four goals in 12 games for the team. He was traded to the Quebec Nordiques for the 1989–90 season, but spent most of the season in the AHL. He finished the season with the Detroit Red Wings before retiring.

Adams finished his career with 84 goals and 227 career points in 545 NHL games, and recorded 1,173 PIM.

Post-playing career
After Adams retired from the NHL, he moved back to Duncan, British Columbia, close to where he grew up. He is now an owner of some Tim Hortons franchises around Duncan.

Career statistics

Awards and honours

References

External links
 

1960 births
Living people
Binghamton Whalers players
Canadian ice hockey left wingers
Detroit Red Wings players
Edmonton Oilers players
Halifax Citadels players
Hartford Whalers players
Ice hockey people from British Columbia
Maine Mariners players
People from Duncan, British Columbia
Philadelphia Flyers players
Quebec Nordiques players
Tim Hortons
Undrafted National Hockey League players
Vancouver Canucks players
Victoria Cougars (WHL) players
Washington Capitals players